The following is a list of telenovelas produced by Mega.

1990s

2000s

2010s

2020s

Upcoming

See also 
 Mega (Chilean TV channel)

References 

Mega
 
Mega telenovelas